"Ain't Complaining" is a single released by the British Rock band Status Quo in 1988. It was included on the album Ain't Complaining.

Some versions of the 7 inch also featured a limited edition History Pack featuring a special outer box made from card and inside part one of the Status Quo family tree - drawn and compiled by Pete Frame. This was Status Quo's first CD single. A video CD was later issued in November 1988.

Track listing

7 inch 
 "Ain't Complaining" (Parfitt/Williams) (3.59)
 "That's Alright" (Rossi/Frost/Parfitt) (3.31)

12 inch 
 "Ain't Complaining" (Extended) (Parfitt/Williams) (6.37)
 "That's Alright" (Rossi/Frost/Parfitt) (3.31)
 "Lean Machine" (Rossi/Parfitt) (3.37)

CD 
 "Ain't Complaining" (Parfitt/Williams) (6.37)
 "That's Alright" (Rossi/Frost/Parfitt) (3.31
 "Lean Machine" (Rossi/Parfitt) (3.37)
 "In The Army Now" (Re-mix) (Bolland/Bolland) (4.44)

CD Video 
 "Ain't Complaining" (Parfitt/Williams) (6.37)
 "That's Alright" (Rossi/Frost/Parfitt) (3.31
 "Lean Machine" (Rossi/Parfitt) (3.37)
 "In The Army Now" (Re-mix) (Bolland/Bolland) (4.44)
 "Ain't Complaining" (Video track)

Charts

References 

Status Quo (band) songs
1988 singles
Songs written by Rick Parfitt
Songs written by Pip Williams
Song recordings produced by Pip Williams
1988 songs
Vertigo Records singles